Eutychius or Eutychios ("fortunate") may refer to: 

 Eutychius Proclus, 2nd-century grammarian
 Eutychius (exarch) (died 752), last Byzantine exarch of Ravenna
 Saint Eutychius, an early Christian martyr and companion of Placidus
 Saint Eutychius, an early Christian martyr and companion of Arcadius
 Patriarch Eutychius of Constantinople (512–582), Patriarch of Constantinople and saint
 Patriarch Eutychius of Alexandria (877–940), Greek Patriarch of Alexandria and historian
 Michael Astrapas and Eutychios (fl. ca. 1300), Greek painters

See also 
 Eutychus, /ˈjuːtɪkəs/ young man of Troas tended to by St. Paul
 Eutyches (380s–450s), presbyter and archimandrite at Constantinople